Fulkerson is an unincorporated community in Scott County, in the U.S. state of Virginia.

History
A post office called Fulkerson was established in 1860, and remained in operation until it was discontinued in 1889. The community was named for early residents James and Abraham Fulkerson.

References

Unincorporated communities in Scott County, Virginia
Unincorporated communities in Virginia